Don Luigi Ruspoli y Godoy, de Khevenhüller-Metsch y Borbón, dei Principi Ruspoli (August 22, 1828 in Florence – December 21, 1893 in Florence) was an Italian and Spanish aristocrat, son of the Prince Camillo Ruspoli and wife Carlota de Godoy y Borbón, 2nd Duchess of Sueca.

He was 3rd Marqués de Boadilla del Monte with a Coat of Arms of Ruspoli (Letter of May 8, 1853) and Prince of the Holy Roman Empire, Knight of Honour of the Sovereign Military Order of Malta, etc.

Marriages and children 

He married firstly in Florence, August 5, 1852 Donna Matilde Martellini (November 13, 1818/1819 in Florence, November 13 – September 8, 1855 in Florence), legitimate daughter of the Marchese Martellini, who was a Mayor (Majordomo-Maggiore) of the Palace of the Grand Duchess of Tuscany, by whom he had a daughter: 

 Donna Carlota Camilla Luisa dei Principi Ruspoli (April 5, 1854 in Florence – September 1, 1930 in Nice) married in Florence, September 4, 1872/1892 Enrico, Conte Casalini (1846–1907), by whom she had an only daughter:
 Matilda, Contessa Casalini (1873 in Florence – 1941 in Nice), unmarried but with illegitament issue

He married secondly in Florence, February 7, 1863  Nobile Emilia Landi (June 25/26, 1824 in Florence – January 5, 1894 in Florence), by whom he had a son:  
 Camillo Ruspoli, 4th Marquis of Boadilla del Monte

Sources 

 
 
 

1828 births
1893 deaths
Luigi
Luigi 03